Astri Knudsen Bech is a Norwegian handball player. She played 103 matches for the Norway women's national handball team between 1970 and 1977.  She participated at the 1971, 1973 and 1975 World Women's Handball Championship.

References

Year of birth missing (living people)
Living people
Norwegian female handball players